Dygert is a surname. Notable people with the surname include:

Chloé Dygert (born 1997), American cyclist
Erwin F. Dygert (1894–1962), American businessman
George Dygert (1870–1957), American football player and lawyer
Jimmy Dygert (1884–1936), American baseball player